Ponticyclops is a genus of copepods in the family Cyclopidae. It is monotypic, being represented by the single species Ponticyclops boscoi. It is endemic to Brazil, where its natural habitat is swamps.

References

Cyclopidae
Cyclopoida genera
Endemic fauna of Brazil
Freshwater crustaceans of South America
Monotypic arthropod genera
Taxonomy articles created by Polbot